Bhoot is a 2003 Indian supernatural horror film directed by Ram Gopal Varma and stars an ensemble cast of Ajay Devgn, Urmila Matondkar, Nana Patekar, Rekha, Fardeen Khan and Tanuja. It was the second horror film made by Ram Gopal Verma after Raat. It was perceived to be different from a typical Hindi film as it did not contain songs. It was later dubbed in Telugu as 12 Va Anthasthu and remade in Tamil as Shock.  

The film was a box-office hit. Urmila won several accolades and awards for her performance as a ghost possessed wife. Verma made a sequel called Bhoot Returns which was released on 12 October 2012.

Plot
The story is about Vishal (Ajay Devgn) who is married to Swati (Urmila Matondkar). The couple rents a high rise apartment at a ridiculously low price. The caretaker of the apartment, Mr. Thakkar (Amar Talwar) explains to Vishal that a widow named Manjeet Khosla (Barkha Madan), the previous resident, committed suicide after killing her own son. Vishal hides this fact from Swati, as she will object to buying such a residence. But the caretaker accidentally slips in the secret.

Swati is extremely livid at Vishal, although he disbelieves the notions of ghosts and bad luck. Then, Swati starts behaving very strangely. Vishal consults Dr. Rajan (Victor Banerjee). But soon enough, Vishal witnesses Swati brutally murdering the watchman of the apartment which no human could have done, and his skepticism is rudely challenged. Inspector Liyaqat Qureshi (Nana Patekar), who reaches the apartment to investigate the death, becomes suspicious of the duo and their strange behavior. He follows Vishal and Dr. Rajan.

Vishal's maid witnesses Swati shouting and throwing Vishal away. She helps him tie her. She tells him that Swati was shouting just like Manjeet and tells him that an exorcist can help her but not doctors. Finally, Vishal's maid calls an exorcist named Sarita (Rekha). Sarita sees the ghosts of Manjeet and her son. She advises Vishal to meet Manjeet's mother (Tanuja), since she can placate her daughter's spirit. Vishal complies and meets Manjeet's mother. He learns from Manjeet's mother that Manjeet was not the type of woman who would commit suicide nor murder her own son. He explains the situation to her and asks her help. She comes with him and somehow placates Manjeet's spirit. 
They come to know that Mr. Thakkar's son, Sanjay (Fardeen Khan) tried to molest Manjeet and when she resisted, she accidentally fell off the balcony and died. Hence, Sarita advises Vishal to call him. Vishal makes an unknown call to Sanjay and tells him that his father is sick. When Sanjay arrives, Vishal cleverly tells Mr. Thakkar and Sanjay to help him take Swati to the hospital.

It is then revealed that many years ago, Sanjay came to visit his father and lusted for Manjeet, after he saw her in the apartment. He broke into her house, and attempted to profess his lust, but when she rejected him, he pushed her and she accidentally fell off the balcony and died. Manjeet's young son witnessed the murder, upon which Sanjay hired the watchman to kill him. 
Manjeet, who has still possessed Swati's body, sees Sanjay and chases him. Qureshi tries to stop her, having no idea of the real story. Swati tries to kill Sanjay by strangulating him. But, Sarita asks Manjeet to leave him as Swati would be blamed later on.

Sanjay escapes, only to find himself surrounded by Vishal, Sarita, Manjeet and Qureshi who now know the truth. A terrified Sanjay confesses to the crimes, upon which Manjeet's mother urges her to stop. Sanjay is arrested by Inspector Qureshi, and thrown into jail. Manjeet leaves Swati's body, and Vishal and Swati live a good life in the apartment. Meanwhile, in the lockup, Qureshi tells Sanjay that death sentences are light penalties for a criminal like him. He wishes that Sanjay gets a bigger punishment. After Qureshi leaves the darkened cell, Sanjay finds himself face to face with Manjeet. He starts begging for mercy, but his voice soon fades out as Manjeet draws closer; it is implied that she kills Sanjay.

Cast

 Urmila Matondkar as Swati
 Ajay Devgn as Vishal Bhatia
 Nana Patekar as Inspector Liyaqat Qureshi
 Rekha as Sarita
 Fardeen Khan as Sanjay Thakkar
 Victor Banerjee as Dr. Rajan
 Tanuja as Mrs. Khosla
 Seema Biswas as Bai
 Barkha Madan as Manjeet Khosla
 Master Akshit as Manjeet's Son

Soundtrack
The soundtrack is under the label T-Series. The music of the film was composed by Salim–Sulaiman. It consists of 7 songs, 1 remix and an instrumental. The whole soundtrack is not used in the movie, except the song "Ghor Andhere" for the ending credits. The song "Bhoot Hoon Main" was recreated in film Lupt, which will be showing Nataša Stanković

Track listing

Production
Bhoot is Director Ram Gopal Varma's second horror film after Raat (1992), starring Revathi. He said about the film, "Though technically it is a horror film, we don't see a murder or any overt horror." Further calling it a "hold-on-to-your-seats horror film". He wanted to break the stereotypes of a typical Indian horror of "a woman in a white sari, mists and screeching." He expressed his intentions of bringing horror "to [audiences] homes in the middle of Mumbai." The film creates terror through sound and everyday objects.

Critical reception
Taran Adarsh wrote about her performance,
 "...the film clearly belongs to Urmila Matondkar all the way. To state that she is excellent would be doing gross injustice to her work. Sequences when she is possessed are simply astounding. If this performance doesn't deserve an award, no other performance should. It beats all competition hollow."
Deepa Gumaste of Rediff.com mentioned that Bhoot gave her the same experience of terror as in Cape Fear (1991) and said:
 "I wondered if I'd get out of the cinema hall alive. Already, the sleek title sequence, with its astonishing visual effects and stunning background score, had me trembling with trepidation."
Anita Gates of The New York Times noted, "...at some point the overdone scary music becomes part of the fun."

Awards
Bollywood Movie Awards
 Bollywood Movie Award – Best Director - Ram Gopal Varma
 Bollywood Movie Award – Best Actress - Urmila Matondkar
Star Screen Awards
 Screen Award for Best Actress - Urmila Matondkar
Zee Cine Awards
 Zee Cine Award for Best Actor – Female - Urmila Matondkar

 49th Filmfare Awards:

Won

 Best Actress (Critics) 
 Best Editing – Shimit Amin
 Best Sound – Dwarak Warrier

Nominated

 Best Director – Ram Gopal Varma
 Best Actress – Urmila Matondkar

Franchise 
In 2012, producer Jitendra Jain, of Alumbra Entertainment, purchased the rights from Nitin Manmohan and produced Bhoot Returns, which was also directed by Ram Gopal Varma. However, unlike Bhoot, it received mixed-to-negative reviews, and was a box-office disaster.

In 2020, Karan Johar's Dharma Productions acquired the rights of the franchise. Bhoot – Part One: The Haunted Ship, starring Vicky Kaushal, Ashutosh Rana, and Bhumi Pednekar, and directed by Bhanu Pratap Singh, was intended to be the first part of a franchise. However, owing to the highly negative response of the film, subsequent entries were shelved.

References

External links
 
 

Films scored by Anand Raj Anand
Indian ghost films
2000s Hindi-language films
2003 films
2003 horror films
2000s supernatural horror films
Films directed by Ram Gopal Varma
Films set in apartment buildings
Indian films about revenge
Films scored by Salim–Sulaiman
Hindi films remade in other languages
Indian supernatural horror films
Hindi-language horror films